Renjin is an implementation of the R programming language atop the Java Virtual Machine. It is free software released under  the GPL. Renjin is tightly integrated with Java to allow the embedding of the interpreter into any Java application with full two-way access between the Java and R code.

Renjin's development is primarily supported by BeDataDriven, but ultimately made possible by several current and past contributors including Mehmet Hakan Satman,
Hannes Mühleisen, and Ruslan Shevchenko.

History
Renjin's roots lie in an abortive 2010 attempt to compile the GNU R interpreter for the JVM via nestedvm, a toolchain which involves cross-compiling C and Fortran code to a static MIPS binary, which nestedvm
can then translate to JVM bytecode. This proved challenging as GNU R had grown to rely heavily on dynamic linking and the best C standard library
implementation available at the time for the MIPS architecture, Newlib, was not fully compatible with the GNU C Library, against which
GNU R had been developed.

The experience with the R4JVM project provided the BeDataDriven team with in depth look at the GNU R codebase, and convinced them
that a new implementation, written in Java, was a feasible undertaking. Development on Renjin began in October 2010, and rapidly resulted in 
a functional, if minimal, interpreter for the R language.

References

External links

Free software programmed in Java (programming language)
JVM programming languages
Scripting languages
 
Cross-platform free software
Array programming languages
Dynamically typed programming languages
Functional languages
Data-centric programming languages
Free statistical software
Literate programming
Numerical analysis software for Linux
Numerical analysis software for macOS
Numerical analysis software for Windows
Data mining and machine learning software
Free data visualization software